Loughridge is a surname. Notable people with the surname include:

B. P. Loughridge (born 1935), American surgeon
John Loughridge (1923–1981), Australian rules footballer
Lavinia Loughridge (1930–2014), British nephrologist
Lee Loughridge, American comics artist
Mark Loughridge (born 1953), American businessman
Robert McGill Loughridge (1809–1900), American Presbyterian missionary
William Loughridge (1827–1889), American lawyer, judge and politician

See also
 Camp Loughridge